The Ducati 100 Scrambler is an on/off road  single cylinder two stroke motorcycle produced by the Italian manufacturer Ducati in 1970 and 1971. The model was produced to take advantage of the dirt bike craze in Italy at the time. The model used many parts from existing models, keeping R&D costs down. A larger engined version, the 100 Scrambler, was also produced. Styling was similar the 125 Cadet Scrambler. The model did not sell well and was soon dropped.

Technical details

Engine and transmission
The engine of the Scrambler was taken from the 50SL. It was a piston ported two stroke of unit construction and had an alloy head and alloy barrel with a chrome-plated bore. Compression ratio was 10.5:1 and claimed power output was  @ 6,000 rpm.

Fuel was delivered by a 18 mm Dell'Orto UA carburettor and ignition was by flywheel magneto. Petrol/oil mix provided lubrication.

Primary drive was by helical gears to a multi-plate wet clutch and a 4 speed gearbox. Chain drive took power to the rear wheel.

Cycle parts
The duplex frame was the same as that used on the Cadet and SL models. Rear suspension was by swinging arm with twin Marzocchi shock absorbers. At the front Ceriani pattern Marzocchi telescopic forks were fitted. Brakes were  diameter drums front and rear.The bike had a high level exhaust and was finished in yellow and black.

References

Bibliography

External links
 

50 Scrambler
Motorcycles introduced in 1970
Single-cylinder motorcycles
Dual-sport motorcycles